The Clue of the Twisted Candle is a 1918 crime novel by the British writer Edgar Wallace.

Plot
In this tale, John Lexman, a renowned mystery writer, is drawn into a murder plot by a wealthy benefactor, only to be betrayed and sent to prison. His friend, the Scotland Yard Commissioner T.X. Meredith, tries to prove he was duped into the murder, only to have him escape from prison. Events lead to another murder and a series of surprises.

Film adaptation
In 1960 it was turned into the film Clue of the Twisted Candle, directed by Allan Davis as part of a long-running series of Wallace films made at Merton Park Studios.

References

Bibliography
 Goble, Alan. The Complete Index to Literary Sources in Film. Walter de Gruyter, 1999.
 https://en.wikisource.org/wiki/The_Clue_of_the_Twisted_Candle

1918 British novels
Novels by Edgar Wallace
British crime novels
Novels set in London
British novels adapted into films